Stewart Anderson (7 June 1911 – 4 June 1997) was an Australian rules footballer who played with St Kilda and North Melbourne in the Victorian Football League (VFL).

Anderson spent three seasons at St Kilda, after arriving to the club from Hamilton. He spent the 1936 season as playing coach of Oakleigh, in the Victorian Football Association. Cleared to North Melbourne, Anderson kicked 18 goals in 1937, all from his opening five games of the year. It was enough to see him finish as the season's leading goal-kicker for North Melbourne. His tally remains the lowest in the club's history to win the goal-kicking award.

References

External links
 

1911 births
1997 deaths
Australian rules footballers from Victoria (Australia)
North Melbourne Football Club players
St Kilda Football Club players
Oakleigh Football Club players
Oakleigh Football Club coaches
Hamilton Football Club players